Mauregatus the Usurper was the king of Asturias from 783 to 788 or 789. He was an illegitimate son of Alfonso I, supposedly by a Moorish serf. He usurped the throne on the death of Silo, the husband of his half sister Adosinda and earning himself the nickname of the Usurper. The nobility had elected Alfonso II at Adosinda's insistence, but Mauregatus assembled a large army of supporters and forced Alfonso into Álava.

Nothing is known in detail of his reign. The adoptionist dispute was raging between Elipandus, Archbishop of Toledo, and Beatus of Liébana and even occasioned the intervention of Charlemagne. Mauregatus also sent back an invading Muslim force.

During his reign a hymn to Saint James was composed with an acrostic mentioning the king's name. This is considered to presage the legend of the saint's burial at Santiago de Compostela.

References

789 deaths
Beni Alfons
Year of birth unknown
Illegitimate children of Spanish monarchs
8th-century Asturian monarchs